The history of Kalahandi goes back to the primitive period where a well-civilized, urbanized, and cultured people inhabited this land mass around 2000 years ago. The world's largest celt of Stone Age and the largest cemetery of the megalithic age have been discovered in Kalahandi.  This shows the region had a civilized culture since the pre-historic era. Asurgarh near Narla in Kalahandi was one of the oldest metropolises in Odisha whereas the other one was Sisupalgarh near Bhubaneswar. Some other historical forts in the region includes Budhigarh (ancient period), Amthagarh (ancient period), Belkhandi (ancient to medieval period) and Dadpur-Jajjaldeypur (medieval period). This land was unconquered by the great Ashoka, who fought the great Kalinga War, as per Ashokan record.

History of Indian districts
Kalahandi district